The Football Conference season of 1991–92 (known as the GM Vauxhall Conference for sponsorship reasons) was the thirteenth season of the Football Conference.

Overview
Colchester United, relegated from the Fourth Division two years earlier, regained their Football League status by winning the Conference title. However, as had happened a year earlier, there was no relegation from the Football League to the Conference due to an expansion of the Football League – which was ultimately never completed due to the bankruptcy of Aldershot late in the 1991–92 season and then Maidstone United (1897) at the start of the 1992–93 season.

New teams in the league this season
 Farnborough Town (promoted 1990–91)
 Redbridge Forest (promoted 1990–91)
 Witton Albion (promoted 1990–91)

Final league table

Results

Top scorers in order of league goals

Promotion and relegation

Promoted
 Colchester United (to the Football League Third Division)
 Bromsgrove Rovers (from the Southern Premier League)
 Stalybridge Celtic (from the Northern Premier League)
 Woking (from the Isthmian League)

Relegated
 Barrow (to the Northern Premier League)
 Cheltenham Town (to the Southern Premier League)

References

External links
 1991–92 Conference National Results

National League (English football) seasons
5